Smiths Mill is an unincorporated community in Blue Earth and Waseca counties in the U.S. state of Minnesota.  The community is located along 631st Avenue near 206th Street and U.S. Highway 14.  Smiths Mill is located within Le Ray Township in Blue Earth County; and also located within Janesville Township in Waseca County.  Nearby places include Janesville and Eagle Lake.

History
A post office called Smith's Mill was first established on May 4, 1876. The post office was discontinued in 1967 when the store closed. The community was named for Peter P. Smith, the owner of a mill.

References

Unincorporated communities in Minnesota
Unincorporated communities in Blue Earth County, Minnesota
Unincorporated communities in Waseca County, Minnesota